Modest Danylovych Sosenko (28 April 1875, Porohy, Galicia, Austria-Hungary — 4 February 1920, Lviv, Second Polish Republic) was a Ukrainian painter and monumental artist.

Life 
Modest Sosenko was born in the village of Porohy of the Austrian Crown lands Kingdom of Galicia and Lodomeria, in present-day Ivano-Frankivsk Raion of Ukrainian Ivano-Frankivsk Oblast, into the family of a priest. With the financial support of Metropolitan Andrey Sheptytsky, he studied at the Jan Matejko Academy of Fine Arts in Krakow from 1896 to 1900, at the Academy of Fine Arts in Munich in 1901 and 1902, and at the École nationale supérieure des arts décoratifs in Paris from 1902 to 1905. He lived in Lviv from 1906, but travelled frequently to Italy in the years between 1908 and 1913, visited the Russian Ukraine in 1913, and Egypt and Palestine in 1914. Between 1916 and 1918, he served as a soldier in the Austrian army on the front lines of World War I.

Sosenko painted portraits, genre scenes, murals, iconostases and church paintings. In the latter, he combined traditional Byzantine art with modern artistic approaches, making him a pioneer of Boychukism. He died in Lviv at the age of 44 and was buried there in the Janiwskyj cemetery.

References 

1875 births
1920 deaths
People from the Kingdom of Galicia and Lodomeria
People from Ivano-Frankivsk Oblast
19th-century Ukrainian painters
19th-century Ukrainian male artists
20th-century Ukrainian painters
20th-century Ukrainian male artists
Ukrainian male painters